This is a list of individuals who have designed one or more role-playing games, including live-action role-playing games but excluding role-playing video games (see List of video game industry people and its children for video game creators). Artists are listed separately on the annotated List of role-playing game artists. Publishing companies are listed under List of role-playing game publishers. Individual games are listed under List of tabletop role-playing games.

The design of role-playing games may include the creation of game systems, game settings and scenarios for roleplaying; game designers engage in one or more of these activities as they create, revise and develop roleplaying games. For each designer, this list includes a few representative games, game lines or publications that the designer in question has created or co-authored or where they are credited with a significant contribution.

A
Justin Achilli - Vampire: The Dark Ages, Victorian Age: Vampire, Vampire: The Requiem; co-creator of Exalted
Mark Acres - Chill; Gangbusters  
Peter Adkison - The Primal Order
Aaron Allston - Autoduel Champions, Ghostbusters International; co-author of Champions 5th edition; contributions to Mystara, including the Hollow World Campaign Set
Dave Allsop - SLA Industries
Terry Amthor - Shadow World; co-author of Space Master
Bryan Ansell - Warhammer Fantasy Roleplay; contributions to Call of Cthulhu
Sandy Antunes - Rules to Live By (LARP), A Faery's Tale
Dave Arneson- co-creator of Dungeons & Dragons (with Gary Gygax); creator of Blackmoor; co-author of Adventures in Blackmoor and Temple of the Frog

B
L. Ross Babcock III - co-creator of the BattleTech setting
Wilf K. Backhaus - co-author of Chivalry & Sorcery
D. Vincent Baker - Dogs in the Vineyard, Apocalypse World 
Keith Baker - Eberron; contributions to Feng Shui and various d20 System publications 
Meguey Baker - Apocalypse World, 1001 Nights, a game of enticing stories, Psi-Run, Valiant Girls
Richard Baker - Alternity, Star Drive, Gamma World (7th edition)
Jim Bambra - co-author of Warhammer Fantasy Roleplay
Cam Banks - co-author of Leverage: The Roleplaying Game and Marvel Heroic Roleplaying; contributions to the Dragonlance setting
Jeff Barber - Killer Crosshairs; co-creator of Blue Planet
M. A. R. Barker - Tékumel, Empire of the Petal Throne
Kevin Barrett - co-author of Space Master
Wolfgang Baur - co-creator of Dark•Matter; contributions to various TSR settings
Greg Benage - co-creator of Blue Planet
Chris Birch - co-author of Starblazer Adventures, Legends of Anglerre
Jolly Blackburn - co-designer of HackMaster and Aces & Eights: Shattered Frontier
Jason L Blair - Little Fears
Bob Bledsaw - founder of Judges Guild; City State of the Invincible Overlord; Wilderlands of High Fantasy
Anders Blixt - Drakar och Demoner 2nd edition
Brian Blume - Boot Hill
Emily Care Boss - Breaking the Ice, Under My Skin, Playing With Intent LARP; co-creator of Bubblegumshoe
Eric L. Boyd - contributions to Forgotten Realms supplements
Rob Boyle - Shadowrun 4th Edition, Eclipse Phase
Mike Breault - contributions to various TSR settings
James Herbert Brennan - Man, Myth & Magic; Timeship
Bill Bridges - Werewolf: The Apocalypse, Mage: The Ascension, Mage: The Awakening, Promethean: The Created, Passion Play LARP; co-creator of Fading Suns
Anne Brown - contributions to various TSR settings
Timothy Brown - 2300 AD; co-author of Dark Sun
Phil Brucato - Mage: The Sorcerers Crusade, Deliria: Faerie Tales for a New Millennium; contributions to Werewolf: The Apocalypse and Mage: The Ascension
Jason Bulmahn - Pathfinder Roleplaying Game

C
Peter Cakebread - co-author of Dark Streets
James Cambias - Star Hero
Brian Campbell - contributions to various World of Darkness settings
C.J. Carella - WitchCraft, Armageddon: The End Times, Buffy, Angel, Unisystem
Jason Carl - contributions to Dungeons & Dragons 3.5 edition and World of Darkness
Mike Carr - In Search of the Unknown; contributions to Advanced Dungeons & Dragons
Michele Carter - contributions to Dungeons & Dragons 4th Edition; compiled and edited Wizards Presents: Races and Classes
Marcelo Cassaro - Street Fighter RPG Brazil; 3D&T
Frank Chadwick - Twilight: 2000, 2300 AD, Space: 1889, Dark Conspiracy
Andy Chambers - contributor to numerous Warhammer 40,000 products
Jamie Chambers - creator of the Cortex System for the Serenity Role Playing Game
Coleman Charlton - Rolemaster, MERP
Bob Charrette - co-author of Bushido, Aftermath!, Daredevils, Shadowrun
David Chart - Ars Magica 5th edition
Davis Chenault - co-founder of Troll Lord Games; co-designer of Castles & Crusades
Stephen Chenault - co-founder of Troll Lord Games; co-designer of Castles & Crusades
Mike Chinn - contributions to Legends of Anglerre
Troy Christensen - Advanced Phantasm Adventures
Deborah Teramis Christian - contributions to various TSR settings
Sam Chupp - co-creator of Wraith: the Oblivion and Changeling: The Dreaming
Ken Cliffe - Ars Magica 3rd edition; World of Darkness 2004 edition; co-creator of Trinity and Hunter: The Reckoning
Bill Coffin - Systems Failure, Septimus
Genevieve Cogman - contributions to In Nomine, Exalted; co-authored Orpheus
Andy Collins - Dungeons & Dragons 4th edition
William W. Connors - contributions to Dungeons & Dragons
David "Zeb" Cook - Dwellers of the Forbidden City, Slave Pits of the Undercity, Amazing Engine system, Advanced Dungeons & Dragons 2nd edition
Monte Cook - Ptolus, Numenera; co-creator of Dungeons & Dragons 3rd edition, 
Sue Weinlein Cook - SAGA System
Bruce Cordell - many Dungeons & Dragons supplements, notably Return to the Tomb of Horrors and the Expanded Psionics Handbook
Steven Cordovano - The Compleat Alchemist
Peter Corless - founder of Green Knight Publishing; contributions to Pendragon
Greg Costikyan - creator of Star Wars: The Roleplaying Game and Violence; co-creator of Toon and Paranoia
Jeremy Crawford - co-designer of Blue Rose; lead game designer for Dungeons & Dragons 4th edition
Croc - In Nomine Satanis/Magna Veritas, Stella Inquisitorus
N. Robin Crossby - Hârn, HarnMaster
John H. Crowe III - contributions to Call of Cthulhu
Paul Czege - My Life with Master

D
Tom Dalgliesh - founder of Columbia Games; co-author of the Pilots' Almanac for HârnMaster
Ryan Dancey - co-author of the Hero Builder's Guidebook; conceived and developed the Open Game License concept
Liz Danforth - Tunnels & Trolls, fifth and subsequent editions 
Richard Dansky - various World of Darkness settings
Peter Darvill-Evans - co-creator of Time Lord; several Fighting Fantasy books
Graeme Davis - Warhammer Fantasy Roleplay, Mind's Eye Theatre LARP
Jesse Decker - contributions to Dungeons & Dragons 4th edition
Tim Dedopulos - contributions to Unknown Armies and Hunter: The Reckoning
Jeff Dee - Villains and Vigilantes
Marcelo Del Debbio - Arkanun, Trevas, RPGQuest (Brazilian RPGs)
Troy Denning - Chill 2nd edition; co-author of Dark Sun
James "Grim" Desborough - Gor role-playing game; contributions to Dungeons & Dragons 3.5 edition
Dennis Detwiller - co-author of Delta Green, Godlike and Nemesis
Joe Dever - Lone Wolf, Greystar, Freeway Warrior
Larry DiTillio - Masks of Nyarlathotep
Kevin Dockery - The Morrow Project
Michael Dobson - contributions to various TSR settings
Rob Donoghue - co-author of  Leverage: The Roleplaying Game, Marvel Heroic Roleplaying and Spirit of the Century
Dale Donovan - contributions to Dungeons & Dragons
Tom Dowd - Mind's Eye Theatre LARP, co-author of Shadowrun, contributions to the Storyteller system
Ann Dupuis - contributions to GURPS and Fudge

E
Ron Edwards - creator of Sorcerer RPG, ELFS, Trollbabe, It Was a Mutual Decision, Spione - Story Now in Cold War Berlin, S/Lay w/me
Skaff Elias - co-author of the Miniatures Handbook
Rose Estes - creator of Endless Quest

F
Sean Patrick Fannon - creator of Shaintar setting for Savage Worlds; The Fantasy Roleplaying Gamer's Bible
Bill Fawcett - Role Aids game supplement line
Pete Fenlon - contributions to Middle-earth Role Playing; Rolemaster; Shadow World
Nigel Findley - Greyspace, GURPS Illuminati; contributions to Shadowrun
Matt Forbeck - Deadlands; Brave New World
John M. Ford - GURPS Time Travel; The Yellow Clearance Black Box Blues and other contributions to Paranoia
Joe D. Fugate, Sr. - Traveller Book 8: Robots

G
Mark Galeotti - Mythic Russia, The Unspoken Word
Phil Gallagher - co-author of Warhammer Fantasy Roleplay; contributions to Dungeons & Dragons modules
Jose Garcia - Nexus: The Infinite City
Richard Garfinkle - Spellcrafter
Marc Gascoigne - Judge Dredd: The Role-Playing Game, Advanced Fighting Fantasy gamebooks
Dan Gelber - co-creator of Paranoia and Marvel Universe Roleplaying Game
Adam Scott Glancy - co-creator of Delta Green
Lee Gold - Lands of Adventure, GURPS Japan
Eric Goldberg - Commando, DragonQuest; co-creator of Paranoia
Joseph Goodman - Dungeon Crawl Classics, Dungeon Crawl Classics Role Playing Game
Greg Gorden - DC Heroes, Earthdawn; co-author of TORG; contributions to Star Wars: The Roleplaying Game
Geoffrey C. Grabowski - Exalted 3rd edition; contributions to Everway and Kindred of the East
Andrew Greenberg - Vampire: The Masquerade developer; co-creator of Fading Suns; creator of Rapture: The Second Coming
Daniel Greenberg - contributions to Vampire: The Masquerade and Werewolf: The Apocalypse
Ed Greenwood - Forgotten Realms
Ray Greer - co-designer of the Fuzion system
Jeff Grubb - Marvel Super Heroes, Manual of the Planes, Spelljammer, d20 Modern; contributions to the Dragonlance and Forgotten Realms settings
Gary Gygax - co-creator of Dungeons & Dragons (with Dave Arneson); creator of Queen of the Spiders, Tomb of Horrors, and Greyhawk; designer of Dangerous Journeys and Lejendary Adventure

H
Lee Hammock - Farscape role-playing game; Dawning Star
Gabrielle Harbowy - adventures for Dungeons & Dragons and Pathfinder Roleplaying Game
David A. Hargrave - Arduin, Star Rovers
Scott Haring - Empires of the Sands and The Republic of Darokin for TSR
John Harshman - co-creator of Traveller
Jess Hartley - contributions to World of Darkness, notably Changeling: The Lost
Robert Hatch - Kindred of the East; co-creator of Trinity, Aberrant, and Exalted
Andria Hayday - Darklords; contributions to various TSR settings
Bruce Heard - The Tree of Life; Into the Maelstrom; co-authored Dragons of Faith
Jess Heinig - Mage: The Ascension; Hunter: The Reckoning
Rob Heinsoo - Dungeons & Dragons 4th edition; co-creator of 13th Age
Steve Henderson - Worlds of Wonder, Balastor's Barracks; co-author of RuneQuest and Superworld
Shane Lacy Hensley - Deadlands, Savage Worlds
Dale "Slade" Henson - Buck Rogers XXVC
Keith Herber - The Fungi from Yuggoth, Trail of Tsathogghua, Spawn of Azathoth and other contributions to  Call of Cthulhu
Jack Herman - co-creator of Villains & Vigilantes
Tracy Hickman - Dragonlance, Ravenloft
Fred Hicks - Don't Rest Your Head; co-author of Spirit of the Century 
Will Hindmarch - Kindred of the Ebony Kingdom, Vampire: The Requiem; co-author of Eternal Lies
Kenneth Hite - GURPS Infinite Worlds, Trail of Cthulhu, Night's Black Agents, Vampire: the Masquerade 5th edition; Fall of Delta Green; co-author of Bubblegumshoe
John Eric Holmes - Dungeons & Dragons Basic Set
Miranda Horner - contributions to Bloodshadows and Shatterzone
Conrad Hubbard - contributions to the World of Darkness settings and Exalted
Paul Hume - co-author of Bushido, Aftermath!, Daredevils, Shadowrun

I
Ross Isaacs - Star Trek: The Next Generation Role-playing Game
Shane Ivey - contributed to The One Ring Roleplaying Game

J
Steve Jackson (Steve Jackson Games) - The Fantasy Trip, GURPS, Yrth
Steve Jackson (Games Workshop) - Fighting Fantasy gamebooks
James Jacobs - contributions to Dungeons & Dragons 3rd edition
Justin D. Jacobson - Dawning Star
Brian R. James - Menzoberranzan: City of Intrigue and other supplements for Dungeons & Dragons
Matt James - Monster Vault: Threats to the Nentir Vale and other supplements for Dungeons & Dragons and Pathfinder
Jennell Jaquays - Dark Tower, Caverns of Thracia; co-author of Griffin Mountain
Harold Johnson - co-author of The Hidden Shrine of Tamoachan and Secret of the Slavers Stockade; contributions to various TSR settings
Gunilla Jonsson - co-author of Mutant and Kult
M. Alexander Jurkat - co-founded Eden Studios, Inc.; All Flesh Must Be Eaten; Magic Item Compendium for D&D 3.5
Adam Jury - contributions to Shadowrun

K
Don Kaye - co-founder of TSR; co-creator of Boot Hill
J. Andrew Keith - Freedom Fighters
William H. Keith Jr. - Behind Enemy Lines, Freedom Fighters
Steve Kenson - Mutants & Masterminds, Freedom City; co-creator of Silver Age Sentinels and Blue Rose
David Kenzer - HackMaster; The Kingdoms of Kalamar
Katharine Kerr - co-author of Legacy of Blood; contributions to Pendragon
Ulrich Kiesow - creator of The Dark Eye
J. Robert King - co-author of Aurora's Whole Realms Catalog
Mary Kirchoff - co-creator of the Dark Sun setting
Adam Koebel - co-author of Dungeon World
Jeff Koke - GURPS Vampire: The Masquerade, GURPS Black Ops
Rudy Kraft - co-author of Griffin Mountain; other contributions to RuneQuest
Charlie Krank - Pavis: Threshold to Danger  
Rick Krebs - Gangbusters
Heike A. Kubasch - Angmar, HARP
Christopher Kubasik - contributions to TORG, Shadowrun and Earthdawn
Robert J. Kuntz - co-author of Gods, Demi-Gods & Heroes

L
David Ladyman - Chill, GURPS The Prisoner
Lenard Lakofka - The Secret of Bone Hill, The Assassin's Knot, Deep Dwarven Delve
Sage LaTorra - co-author of Dungeon World 
Robin D. Laws - Feng Shui, HeroQuest, Dying Earth Roleplaying Game, The Esoterrorists and other GUMSHOE games, Hillfolk, The Yellow King Roleplaying Game
Jeff R. Leason - co-author of The Hidden Shrine of Tamoachan; contributions to Chill
Andrew Leker - Skyrealms of Jorune
Paul Lidberg - Duel
Ken Lightner - Real-Life Roleplaying Series for the d20 System
Nicole Lindroos - contributions to Everway and Unknown Armies
Ian Livingstone - Fighting Fantasy gamebooks
Kerry Lloyd - co-author of Thieves' Guild; co-founder of Gamelords
Steve Long - Dark Champions, Hero System 5th and 6th editions, Star Trek: Deep Space Nine Role Playing Game, Star Trek Roleplaying Game, The Lord of the Rings Roleplaying Game
James Lowder - Pulp Cthulhu
T. S. Luikart - Adventures in Middle-earth

M
George MacDonald - co-creator of Champions and the Hero System
Mark C. MacKinnon - Big Eyes, Small Mouth, The Sailor Moon Role-Playing Game and Resource Book; co-author of Silver Age Sentinels
Jeff Mackintosh - co-author of Silver Age Sentinels
Ari Marmell - contributions to Scarred Lands and Vampire: The Masquerade
Ian Marsh - Time Lord
Stephen R. Marsh - Dungeons & Dragons Expert Set; credited with creation of alignment system for Dungeons & Dragons
Julia Martin - co-author of Faiths & Avatars; contributions to Dungeons & Dragons 3rd edition
Phil Masters - GURPS Castle Falkenstein, Hellboy Sourcebook and Roleplaying Game; GURPS Discworld (with Terry Pratchett) 
Colin McComb - co-author of the Birthright Campaign Setting; contributions to various TSR settings
Angel Leigh McCoy - contributions to Mage: The Ascension and Changeling: The Dreaming
Elizabeth McCoy - co-author of GURPS In Nomine and GURPS Illuminati University
Anne Gray McCready - Mystery of the Snow Pearls, Red Sonja Unconquered
Mike Mearls - Iron Heroes, co-creator of Dungeons & Dragons 5th edition
Frank Mentzer - D&D Basic Set third edition; co-author of Temple of Elemental Evil
Marc W. Miller - various incarnations of Traveller
Steve Miller - contributions to Dungeons & Dragons 3rd edition, including Into the Dragon's Lair
Walter Milliken - GURPS Illuminati University
Kim Mohan - Cyborg Commando, Wilderness Survival Guide for Advanced Dungeons and Dragons; also editor of Dragon magazine
Tom Moldvay - Lords of Creation, D&D Basic Set second edition, Castle Amber; co-creator of Isle of Dread, Mystara
Erik Mona - contributions to the Greyhawk setting: also editor of Dragon and Dungeon magazines
Christian Moore - Aria: Canticle of the Monomyth; co-author of Star Trek: The Next Generation Role-playing Game
James A. Moore - contributions to various World of Darkness games
Roger E. Moore - Greyhawk: The Adventure Begins; also editor of Dragon magazine
Jenna K. Moran - Nobilis, The Game of Powers (LARP), Chuubo's Marvelous Wish-Granting Engine
Jason Morningstar - Durance, Grey Ranks, Fiasco
Dave Morris - Dragon Warriors
Graeme Morris - contributions to various TSR settings
Josh Mosqueira - Constantinople by Night, Montreal by Night; co-author of Tribe 8

N
Pete Nash - co-author of RuneQuest II
John Nephew - co-founded Atlas Games; Tall Tales of the Wee Folk
Bruce Nesmith - Gamma World 4th edition; co-author of Lankhmar – City of Adventure; contributions to the Dragonlance and Ravenloft settings
Douglas Niles - Star Frontiers, Top Secret/S.I., Against the Cult of the Reptile God; co-author of Lankhmar – City of Adventure; contributions to the Dragonlance setting
Clinton R. Nixon - The Shadow of Yesterday, Donjon, Paladin
David Noonan - contributions to many Dungeons & Dragons products
Mike Nystul - The Whispering Vault

O
Michael O'Brien - contributions to RuneQuest
Steffan O'Sullivan - FUDGE, GURPS Swashbucklers, GURPS Bunnies & Burrows

P
Scott Palter - co-author of Deadspeak Dossier for The World of Necroscope
Blaine Pardoe - Domination
Derek Pearcy - In Nomine
Chris Perkins - lead story designer for Ravenloft campaign Curse of Strahd
Jeff Perren - co-creator of Chainmail
Don Perrin - co-designer of Dragonlance Campaign Setting; Sovereign Stone
Steve Perrin - main author of RuneQuest, the Basic Role-Playing system and Steve Perrin's Quest Rules; co-author of Superworld
Michael Petersén - co-author of Mutant and KULT
Sandy Petersen - main author of Call of Cthulhu; co-author of RuneQuest and Ghostbusters
Steve Peterson - co-creator of Champions, the Hero System and the Fuzion system
John R. Phythyon, Jr. - co-author of Heaven & Earth and Ghost Dog 
Jon Pickens - Arms and Equipment Guide for Advanced Dungeons & Dragons, 2nd edition
Mike Pohjola - Star Wreck Roleplaying Game, Age of the Tempest, Turku School experimental LARP
Mike Pondsmith - Mekton, Cyberpunk, Castle Falkenstein; co-creator of the Fuzion system 
Greg Porter - TimeLords, CORPS, EABA
Chris Pramas - Dragon Age, Warhammer Fantasy Roleplay 2nd edition, Freeport setting
Patrick Lucien Price - contributions to Leaves from the Inn of the Last Home supplement for Dragonlance
Anthony Pryor - contributions to various TSR settings
Lewis Pulsipher - contributions to Fiend Folio for TSR; Swords & Wizardry
David L. Pulver - Transhuman Space, GURPS Reign of Steel, GURPS Technomancer; co-author of Ghost Dog; system contributions to GURPS and Tri-Stat dX
Sean Punch - GURPS 4th edition, GURPS Lite

R
Jean Rabe - contributions to Dungeons & Dragons and Gamma World
Merle M. Rasmussen - Top Secret
A. Mark Ratner - Space Marines, co-author of Space Opera
John D. Rateliff - The Lord of the Rings Roleplaying Game
Philip Reed -
Paul Reiche III - contributions to Dungeons & Dragons products; co-authored Legion of Gold adventure for Gamma World
Thomas M. Reid - contributions to AD&D; Star Wars Roleplaying Game; The Wheel of Time Roleplaying Game
Mark Rein·Hagen - Vampire: The Masquerade and other World of Darkness games; the Storyteller system; co-creator of Ars Magica
Sean K. Reynolds - contributions  to Greyhawk, Forgotten Realms and other TSR settings.
Andrew Rilstone - co-authored The Dying of the Light
Ken Rolston - co-author of Lankhmar – City of Adventure; contributions to Paranoia, Star Wars, RuneQuest and Mystara
Aaron S. Rosenberg - Deryni Adventure Game
S. John Ross - Uresia: Grave of Heaven, Risus; co-author of GURPS Black Ops
Marcus Rowland - Forgotten Futures, Diana: Warrior Princess, The Original Flatland Role Playing Game
Charles M. Ryan - contributions to Dungeons and Dragons 3.5
Gareth Ryder-Hanrahan - Traveller Core Rulebook; The Laundry RPG

S
Ken St. Andre - Tunnels & Trolls,  Starfaring, Monsters! Monsters!
R.A. Salvatore - Menzoberranzan
Carl Sargent - contributions to Greyhawk and Warhammer settings
R. Hyrum Savage - Diomin; contributed to Forbidden Kingdoms
Steven Schend - contributions to various TSR settings
Lawrence Schick - White Plume Mountain, In the Dungeons of the Slave Lords; co-creator of Mystara
Robert J. Schwalb - Dungeons & Dragons; A Song of Ice and Fire Roleplaying; Warhammer Fantasy Roleplay
Jesse Scoble - El-Hazard Role-Playing Game
Stephan Michael Sechi - creator of Talislanta
Mike Selinker - co-author of Marvel Super Heroes Adventure Game
Matthew Sernett - contributions to Dungeons & Dragons 4th edition
Owen Seyler - Aria: Canticle of the Monomyth
Kevin Siembieda - The Mechanoid Invasion, Palladium Fantasy Role-Playing Game, Heroes Unlimited, Robotech, Rifts
Edward E. Simbalist - co-author of Space Opera and Chivalry & Sorcery
Ethan Skemp - Werewolf: The Apocalypse, Werewolf: The Wild West, Werewolf: The Forsaken, Changeling: The Lost, Geist: The Sin-Eaters
Bill Slavicsek - Alternity, d20 Modern, Star Wars Roleplaying Game; co-author of TORG, contributions to Dungeons & Dragons 3rd edition
Carl Smith - contributions to Dragonlance; co-founded Pacesetter
Lester W. Smith - 2300 AD; Dark Conspiracy
Mark Smith - co-author of Fighting Fantasy and Way of the Tiger gamebooks
John Snead - co-creator of Blue Rose; contributions to Exalted, Trinity and Mage: The Awakening
Richard Snider - Adventures in Fantasy; Powers & Perils; contributed to Thieves' World
Ree Soesbee - co-author of Celtic Age d20 sourcebook
Jared Sorensen - InSpectres
Lucien Soulban - Heaven & Earth, Orpheus
Warren Spector - co-author of TOON and Send in the Clones
Garry Spiegle - contributions to Dragonlance
Matthew Sprange - co-founder of Mongoose Publishing; Lone Wolf Multiplayer Game Book
Michael Stackpole - Mercenaries, Spies and Private Eyes
Greg Stafford - creator of the Glorantha setting, co-author of RuneQuest and designer of the Arthurian RPGs Pendragon and Prince Valiant: The Story-Telling Game
Stan! - principal designer for d20 Modern; co-author of Marvel Super Heroes Adventure Game
Ed Stark - MasterBook system, Paranoia "fifth edition"; contributions to Dungeons & Dragons 3rd edition 
Lisa J. Steele - co-author of Bubblegumshoe
Owen K.C. Stephens - Pathfinder Roleplaying Game; Starfinder Roleplaying Game; Star Wars Roleplaying Game
Lisa Stevens - editor for Ars Magica; founder of Paizo Publishing
Doug Stewart - Encyclopedia Magica
Greg Stolze - Usagi Yojimbo RPG, REIGN, Better Angels; co-author of Unknown Armies, Godlike and the Delta Green RPG
CA Suleiman - Mummy: The Resurrection, Vampire: The Requiem, Mummy: The Curse
Rick Swan - contributions to Advanced Dungeons & Dragons for TSR

T
Brennan Taylor - How We Came To Live Here
Paul Tevis - A Penny for My Thoughts
Gary L. Thomas - contributions to Traveller and Dungeons & Dragons
Chris Thomasson - contributions to Dungeons & Dragons
Howard Thompson - contributions to The Fantasy Trip
Rodney Thompson - d20 Future; contributions to Star Wars Roleplaying Game, Dark Sun
Jamie Thomson - contributions to Fighting Fantasy series
Jeff Tidball - Ars Magica 4th edition; Eternal Lies
Mike Tinney - Mind's Eye Theatre LARP
Adam Tinworth - Demon: The Fallen, Werewolf: The Forsaken; contributions to Hunter: The Reckoning
Richard Tucholka - Fringeworthy, Bureau 13
Don Turnbull - editor of the Fiend Folio; contributions to Greyhawk setting for TSR
Jonathan Tweet - Over the Edge, Everway; co-creator of Ars Magica, Dungeons & Dragons 3rd edition and 13th Age
John Scott Tynes - Puppetland, The Golden Dawn; co-creator of Delta Green and Unknown Armies

U
Chad Underkoffler - Dead Inside, Truth & Justice, The Zorcerer of Zo, Swashbucklers of the 7 Skies

V
Monica Valentinelli - Firefly Role-Playing Game
Susan Van Camp - Dragon Storm
Allen Varney - the 2004 edition of Paranoia for Mongoose Publishing; co-author of Send in the Clones; contributions to the Hollow World setting for Mystara
George Vasilakos - Conspiracy X, All Flesh Must Be Eaten
Greg A. Vaughan - contributions to Dungeons & Dragons and Pathfinder Roleplaying Game

W
James Wallis - The Extraordinary Adventures of Baron Munchausen 
James M. Ward - Metamorphosis Alpha, Gamma World; co-author of Gods, Demi-Gods & Heroes
Ross Watson - Warhammer 40,000 Roleplay
Darren Watts - co-author of Champions 5th edition
Margaret Weis - Dragonlance
Jordan Weisman - co-creator of the BattleTech setting
Jean Wells - Palace of the Silver Princess
Chuck Wendig - co-author of Hunter: The Vigil
David Wesely - Braunstein games
Lawrence Whitaker - contributions to Basic Role Playing
John Wick - Legend of the Five Rings, Orkworld; co-creator of 7th Sea
Steve Wieck - co-creator of Exalted, Mage: the Ascension and other World of Darkness games
Stewart Wieck - co-creator of Mage: the Ascension, Hunter: The Reckoning and other World of Darkness games
Chris Wiese - contributions to Fading Suns
J. D. Wiker - contributions to Star Wars Roleplaying Game and Dungeons & Dragons 3rd edition
Skip Williams - co-creator of Dungeons & Dragons 3rd Edition
Walter Jon Williams - Privateers & Gentlemen 
Lynn Willis - co-author of RuneQuest, Basic Role-Playing, Stormbringer, Call of Cthulhu and Ghostbusters
Kevin Wilson - Spycraft; co-creator of 7th Sea
Ray Winninger - Underground
Steve Winter - co-author of Marvel Super Heroes 
Loren Wiseman - author of GURPS Traveller; contributions to Traveller
Teeuwynn Woodruff - The World of Species for the MasterBook system; World of Darkness: Gypsies; contributions to Bloodshadows and the Ravenloft setting 
Erick Wujcik - Teenage Mutant Ninja Turtles & Other Strangeness, After the Bomb, Ninjas & Superspies, Amber Diceless Role-Playing 
James Wyatt - Oriental Adventures for  Dungeons & Dragons 3rd edition

Y-Z
Mike Young - Rules to Live By LARP

References

Designers
Role-playing games